Sycon is a genus of calcareous sponges belonging to the family Sycettidae. These sponges are small, growing up to 7.5 cm with a length from 2.5 to 7.5 cm, and are tube-shaped and often white to cream in colour. They are known to aquarium hobbyists as "Pineapple" or "Q-Tip" sponges, and are frequent "hitchhikers" accidentally brought in.

Species
The following species are recognised in the genus Sycon:
Sycon abyssale Borojevic & raat-Kleeton, 1965
Sycon acanthoxea (Little, 1963)
Sycon album Tanita, 1942
Sycon ampulla (Haeckel, 1870)
Sycon antarcticum (Jenkin, 1908)
Sycon arcticum (Haeckel, 1870)
Sycon australe (Jenkin, 1908)
Sycon avus Chagas & Cavalcanti, 2017
Sycon barbadense (Schuffner, 1877)
Sycon bellum Chagas & Cavalcanti, 2017
Sycon boreale (Schuffner, 1877)
Sycon brasiliense Borojevic, 1971
Sycon calcaravis Hozawa, 1929
Sycon caminatum Thacker, 1908
Sycon capricorn Wörheide & Hooper, 2003
Sycon carteri Dendy, 1893
Sycon ciliatum (Fabricius, 1780)
Sycon coactum (Urban, 1906)
Sycon compactum Lambe, 1893
Sycon conulosum Cóndor-Luján, Louzada, Hajdu & Klautau, 2018
Sycon cylindricum Tanita, 1942
Sycon defendens Borojevic, 1967
Sycon digitiforme Hozawa, 1929
Sycon dunstervillia (Haeckel, 1872)
Sycon eglintonense Lambe, 1900
Sycon elegans (Bowerbank, 1845)
Sycon ensiferum Dendy, 1893
Sycon escanabense Duplessis & Reiswig, 2000
Sycon faulkneri Ilan, Gugel, Galil & Janussen, 2003
Sycon formosum (Haeckel, 1870)
Sycon frustulosum Borojevic & Peixinho, 1976
Sycon gelatinosum (Blainville, 1834)
Sycon giganteum Dendy, 1893
Sycon globulatum Hozawa, 1929
Sycon grantioides Dendy, 1916
Sycon helleri (Lendenfeld, 1891)
Sycon hozawai Breitfuss, 1932
Sycon huinayense Azevedo, Hajdu, Willenz & Klautau, 2009
Sycon humboldti Risso, 1826 type species
Sycon inconspicuum (Lendenfeld, 1885)
Sycon incrustans Breitfuss, 1898
Sycon karajakense Breitfuss, 1897
Sycon kerguelense Urban, 1908
Sycon lambei Dendy & Row, 1913
Sycon lendenfeldi Row & Hozawa, 1932
Sycon lingua (Haeckel, 1870)
Sycon lunulatum (Haeckel, 1872)
Sycon luteolum Tanita, 1942
Sycon magnapicale Cóndor-Luján, Louzada, Hajdu & Klautau, 2018
Sycon matsushimense Tanita, 1940
Sycon mexico Hozawa, 1940
Sycon minutum Dendy, 1893
Sycon misakiense Hozawa, 1929
Sycon mundulum Lambe, 1900
Sycon munitum Jenkin, 1908
Sycon natalense Borojevic, 1967
Sycon okadai Hozawa, 1929
Sycon ornatum Kirk, 1898
Sycon oscari Van Soest & De Voogd, 2018
Sycon parvulum (Preiwisch, 1904)
Sycon pedicellatum Kirk, 1911
Sycon pentactinalis Rossi, Farina, Borojevic & Klautau, 2006
Sycon plumosum Tanita, 1943
Sycon proboscideum Breitfuss, 1898
Sycon proboscideum (Haeckel, 1870)
Sycon protectum Lambe, 1896
Sycon pulchrum Tanita, 1943
Sycon quadrangulatum (Schmidt, 1868)
Sycon ramsayi (Lendenfeld, 1885)
Sycon raphanus Schmidt, 1862
Sycon rotundum Tanita, 1941
Sycon satsumense Hozawa, 1929
Sycon scaldiense (Van Koolwijk, 1982)
Sycon schmidti (Haeckel, 1872)
Sycon schuffneri Dendy & Row, 1913
Sycon setosum Schmidt, 1862
Sycon simushirense Hozawa, 1918
Sycon stauriferum (Preiwisch, 1904)
Sycon subhispidum (Carter, 1886)
Sycon sycandra (Lendenfeld, 1895)
Sycon tuba Lendenfeld, 1891
Sycon urugamii Tanita, 1940
Sycon verum Row & Hozawa, 1931
Sycon vigilans Sarà & Gaino, 1971
Sycon villosum (Haeckel, 1870)
Sycon yatsui Hozawa, 1929

References

Leucosolenida
Sponge genera